Jan Günther is a German sprint canoer who competed in the late 1990s. He won three medals at the ICF Canoe Sprint World Championships with a silver (K-4 500 m: 1997) and two bronzes (K-4 200 m: 1995).

References

German male canoeists
Living people
Year of birth missing (living people)
ICF Canoe Sprint World Championships medalists in kayak